King/Drew Magnet High School of Medicine and Science is a magnet high school of the Los Angeles Unified School District, located in Willowbrook, unincorporated Los Angeles County, California, United States.

It is affiliated with both the Martin Luther King Jr. Community Hospital and the Charles R. Drew University of Medicine and Science.

History
The school opened in bungalows across the street from the Martin Luther King Jr./Drew Medical Center and adjacent to the Charles R. Drew University of Medicine and Science in 1982. In 1999 it moved to a standalone campus adjacent to the original bungalows. It was the dream of the principal during the mid 90s, Dr. Ernie Roy, to move from the bungalows, into a bigger school, that was more representative of Dr. Martin Luther King Jr. and Dr. Charles R. Drew. Dr. Ernie Roy was also a key player in the founding of King/Drew Medical Magnet High School.

In 2005, J. Michelle Woods, the principal, stated that problems at the King/Drew hospital caused damage to the perception of the high school. According to Mitchell Landsberg of the Los Angeles Times, the administrators and students at the school stated that the problems at the university and medical center did not affect them.

On September 14, 2007, Hillary Clinton made an appearance at King/Drew Magnet High School.

In 2008 and 2009 U.S. News & World Report ranked King/Drew Magnet High School as a silver medal winner amongst America's best high schools.

In 2017 the school was named a California Gold Ribbon School.

Academics
The school requires all students to adhere to the course loads, including four years of mathematics, two years of a foreign language, and two years of science, required by the University of California, Los Angeles and California State University, Los Angeles. In 2015, seventy-two percent of King/Drew's tested students met or exceeded the  Smarter Balanced standards in English language arts.

Demographics
As of 2005 the school had slightly fewer than 1,700 students. As of that year, the school had twice the number of female students as it does male students. Administrators at King/Drew stated that because the school does not offer American football, more girls than boys apply to the school.

Student performance
In 2005, Richard "Richie" Black, the assistant vice chancellor for admissions and enrollment of the University of California, Berkeley (UC Berkeley), stated that of all high schools, King/Drew had the second highest combined number of Black and Latino/Chicano students accepted by his school. As of 2005, the school, out of all high schools in the United States, habitually has the highest number of black students going to the University of California, Los Angeles (UCLA). As of that year, five University of California campuses, including UCLA, accepted students at King/Drew. In addition, Cornell University, Duke University, Harvard University, Princeton University, Columbia University, Case Western Reserve University and Stanford University accepted King/Drew students. In 2005. there were 20 King/Drew students accepted to UCLA. Twelve of them were Latino and eight were Black.

Sports
 Basketball
 Soccer
 Volleyball
 Baseball
 Softball
 Cross country
 Football
Track and field
The school is also home to the Drew League, a pro-am basketball league.

References

External links

LAUSD School Profile of King Drew Magnet High School

King Drew
King Drew
King Drew Magnet High School
King Drew
King Drew
King Drew
King Drew Magnet High School
King Drew High School
King Drew High School